Naim Süleymanoğlu (23 January 1967 – 18 November 2017) was a Bulgarian-born Turkish Olympic weightlifter. He was a seven-time World Weightlifting champion and a three-time Olympic gold medalist who set 46 world records. At 147 cm in height, Süleymanoğlu's short stature and great strength led to him being nicknamed "Pocket Hercules". He is widely considered as one of the greatest Olympic weightlifters of all time. He is the best pound-for-pound weightlifter in the history of weightlifting.

At the 1988 Summer Olympics, Süleymanoğlu set multiple world records in the featherweight division in the snatch, clean and jerk, and total. Following the 1988 Summer Olympics, he made the cover of Time magazine. Süleymanoğlu went on to win Olympic gold in 1992 and 1996. He was awarded the Olympic Order in 2001. In 2000 and 2004, he was elected as a member of the International Weightlifting Federation Hall of Fame.

Early life, early career, and defection to Turkey
Süleymanoğlu was born in Ptichar, Kardzhali Province, Bulgaria to an ethnic Turkish family. His father was a miner who stood only five feet tall, while his mother was four-foot-seven. He set a world weightlifting record during his teens and would have been an overwhelming favorite to win gold at the 1984 Summer Olympics had Bulgaria not joined in a boycott by the Eastern Bloc.

In the 1980s, Bulgaria's government implemented a program called the Revival Process which required ethnic minorities to adopt Slavic names and barred their languages. As a result, Süleymanoğlu was forced to change his name to Naum Shalamanov (Bulgarian: Наум Шаламанов) in 1985. He decided to leave Bulgaria after these experiences and he conducted encrypted correspondence with Turkish Squad during the period.

While on a trip to the World Cup Final in Melbourne in 1986, Süleymanoğlu escaped his handlers, and after several days in hiding, he defected at the Turkish Embassy in Canberra. When Embassy officials reported the situation to Turgut Özal, The Prime Minister ordered him to be brought at once. He landed in London first, where he was transferred into a private jet to fly into Istanbul and Ankara eventually. After making his way to Istanbul, he changed his name back to Süleymanoğlu.

In 2012, Süleymanoğlu said, "Against all the odds, I've never been nostalgic. After being treated with such attitude, you wouldn't regret it. The Bulgarians changed the names of 2 million people by force. It was a very difficult period. People who witnessed the events would know. I wouldn't change any of the decisions I took that day in my life. Even if I could set back the clock, I would still escape Bulgaria. Because as the Turkish people, we were too hard-pressed in Bulgaria."

Olympic competition
In order for Süleymanoğlu to compete at the 1988 Seoul Olympics, the Bulgarian government had to agree to release his eligibility to Turkey. The Turks paid Bulgaria $1.25 million for his release.

At the Olympics, Süleymanoğlu competed in the featherweight division. His main competition was his old teammate from the Bulgarian team, Stefan Topurov. He came out for the snatch portion of the competition after all other athletes had finished and made three consecutive lifts, setting world records in his last two attempts. In the clean and jerk portion, Topurov completed a 175.0 kg clean and jerk after Süleymanoğlu. With his next two lifts, Süleymanoğlu set two more world records and won his first Olympic gold. His last lift was a 190.0 kg clean and jerk that was 3.15 times his body weight, which is the highest ratio clean and jerk to body weight of all time. Using the Sinclair coefficient, his performance at the 1988 Seoul Olympics was the most dominating weightlifting performance of all time. His total was high enough to win the weight class above his. After the 1988 Summer Olympics, Süleymanoğlu appeared on the cover of Time magazine. The 4'10" Süleymanoğlu's "diminutive size and stunning strength" led to him being nicknamed "Pocket Hercules".

Süleymanoğlu retired from weightlifting at the age of 22 after winning the world championship in 1989. However, he returned to the sport in 1991 and won a second Olympic gold medal in Barcelona in 1992. He retired after winning a third consecutive Olympic gold medal in Atlanta at the 1996 Olympic Games. That competition was noted for the rivalry between Süleymanoğlu and Greece's Valerios Leonidis, with the arena divided into partisan Turkish and Greek crowds. At the end of the competition, they were the last competitors remaining as they traded three straight world-record lifts. Süleymanoğlu managed to raise 187.5 kg, and then Leonidis failed in his attempt to lift 190 kg which earned Süleymanoğlu the gold medal. In a show of sportsmanship Süleymanoğlu embraced Leonidis, who had broke down in tears. Announcer Lynn Jones proclaimed, "You have just witnessed the greatest weightlifting competition in history," according to Ken Jones of The Independent.

Süleymanoğlu made another comeback in a late attempt to earn a fourth gold medal at the 2000 Olympic Games in Sydney, which would have been an Olympic record. However, he failed three attempts at 145 kg and was eliminated from the competition.

Süleymanoğlu is the first and only weightlifter to have snatched 2.5 times his body weight and also is the second of only seven lifters to date to clean and jerk three times his body weight. He is the only weightlifter to date to clean and jerk 10 kilos more than triple his bodyweight.

Over the course of his career, Süleymanoğlu won seven World Weightlifting champion and three Olympic gold medals, and set a total of 46 world records. He was awarded the Olympic Order in 2001. In 2000 and 2004, he was elected a member of the International Weightlifting Federation Hall of Fame. Süleymanoğlu is widely considered to have been the best pound-for-pound Olympic weightlifter of all time, and one of the greatest Olympic weightlifters ever. He is regarded as a national hero in Turkey.

Political career
At the 1999 general elections, Süleymanoğlu stood as an independent candidate to represent Bursa at the Grand National Assembly of Turkey. In 2002, he was the candidate of the Nationalist Movement Party for the mayor of Kıraç municipality in Büyükçekmece district of Istanbul Province; he represented the same party in general elections in 2006. Süleymanoğlu was unsuccessful in each of these bids for public office.

Personal life and death
Süleymanoğlu suffered from cirrhosis of the liver. In 2009, he was hospitalized for nearly three months.

On 25 September 2017, Süleymanoğlu was admitted to a hospital due to liver failure. On 6 October, a liver transplantation was made when a liver donor was found. On 11 November, he had surgery due to a hemorrhage in the brain and a subsequent edema. He died on 18 November 2017 and was interred at the Edirnekapı Martyr's Cemetery in Istanbul.

After Süleymanoğlu's death, a movie about his life and career, Cep Herkülü: Naim Süleymanoğlu was released in Turkey on November 22, 2019.

Süleymanoğlu's grave was opened on July 4, 2018 for the purpose of extracting a DNA sample. Following his death, a Japanese woman had claimed that her daughter, Sekai Mori, had been fathered by him, and filed a paternity case at a Turkish court. A DNA test confirmed the paternity claim. Süleymanoğlu also had three daughters by a Turkish woman.

Major results

Career bests 
 Snatch: 152.5 kg in class to 60 kg.
 Clean and jerk: 170.5 kg 1984 in Varna in class to 56 kg.
 Clean and jerk: 190.0 kg in class to 60 kg.
 Total: 342.5 kg (152.5 + 190.0) 1988 Summer Olympics in class to 60 kg.
Sinclair points: 504, in theory best lifter for size ever.

References 

<ref>https://www.amazon.com/Ridjah-Lifting-Weightlifting-Non-Padded-Powerlifting/dp/B09XQY7NWQ/ref=sr_1_3?crid=1F2JVWVTX2AY6&keywords=ridjah&qid=1672655838&sprefix=ridjah%2Caps%2C431&sr=8-3&th=1/ref>== External links ==

External links
 

1967 births
2017 deaths
Bulgarian male weightlifters
Turkish male weightlifters
Bulgarian Turks in Turkey
Bulgarian emigrants to Turkey
People from Momchilgrad
Olympic weightlifters of Turkey
Olympic gold medalists for Turkey
Weightlifters at the 1988 Summer Olympics
Weightlifters at the 1992 Summer Olympics
Weightlifters at the 1996 Summer Olympics
Weightlifters at the 2000 Summer Olympics
Bulgarian defectors
World record setters in weightlifting
World record holders in Olympic weightlifting
Olympic medalists in weightlifting
Nationalist Movement Party politicians
European champions for Turkey
Medalists at the 1996 Summer Olympics
Medalists at the 1992 Summer Olympics
Medalists at the 1988 Summer Olympics
Deaths from liver failure
Burials at Edirnekapı Martyr's Cemetery
European Weightlifting Championships medalists
World Weightlifting Championships medalists
Liver transplant recipients